Oh Joo-yeon is a South Korean voice actress who joined the Munhwa Broadcasting Corporation's voice acting division in 1997.

Roles

Broadcast TV
Ojamajo Doremi (Magical Remi from 1st - 3rd Series, Korea TV Edition, MBC and TV Special of Korea Edition, Tooniverse)
Fairy Pipi (Korea TV Edition, MBC)
Bikkuriman (Bumerang Fighter, Korea TV Edition, MBC)
Fruits Basket (Korea TV Edition, MBC and Tooniverse)
Tori Go! Go! (KBS)

Movie dubbing
The Others (replacing Alakina Mann, Korea TV Edition, MBC)

See also
Munhwa Broadcasting Corporation
MBC Voice Acting Division

Homepage
MBC Voice Acting division Oh Joo-yeon blog (in Korean)

South Korean voice actresses
Living people
Year of birth missing (living people)